The Benzino Project is the debut solo studio album by American rapper Benzino. It was released on October 30, 2001 through Motown and ZNO Records. Recording sessions took place at Daddy's Home and at The Hit Factory in New York, at Source Sound Lab, at Future Recording Studios in Virginia Beach, at Audio Vision Recording Studio, Hit Factory and Bogart Studio in Miami. Produced primarily by Benzino's production team Hangmen 3, as well as Teddy Riley, Deric "D-Dot" Angelettie, Sean "Puffy" Combs and Trackmasters, it features guest appearances from Bobby Brown, Black Rob, Cormega, Foxy Brown, Outlawz, Pink, Prodigy, P. Diddy, Raekwon, Ray Ray, Scarface, Snoop Dogg, Superb, and Made Men. The album peaked at number 84 on the Billboard 200 and number 24 on the Top R&B/Hip-Hop Albums. Its lead single, "Boottee", made it to #11 on the Hot Rap Songs.

In 2002, Benzino released a remix version of the album called The Benzino Remix Project.

Track listing 

Notes
Track 15 is actually a duet between Bobby Brown and Wiseguys/Made Men member Mr. Gzus; Benzino appears on the track as part of production team Hangmen 3

Sample credits
Track 13 contains a sample from "You Treat Me Good" written by Harry Wayne Casey
Track 15 contains a sample from "Settle for My Love" written by Patrice Rushen, Freddie Washington and Sheree Brown and performed by Patrice Rushen
Track 19 contains samples from "The Bertha Butt Boogie" written by Jimmy Castor and John Pruitt
Track 21 contains a sample from "Back to Love" written by Michael Jones and performed by Evelyn "Champagne" King

Charts

References

External links

Motown albums
Benzino albums
2001 debut albums
Albums produced by D-Dot
Albums produced by Sean Combs
Albums produced by Teddy Riley
Albums produced by Trackmasters